This is a complete list of drivers and teams who have competed in the World Touring Car Cup since the 2018 season.

Drivers
Key

This list is accurate up to and including the WTCR Race of Belgium on 13 September 2020.

References

 
Lists of auto racing people